San Juan is a municipality in the Honduran department of La Paz.

Demographics
At the time of the 2013 Honduras census, San Juan municipality had a population of 2,447. Of these, 99.67% were Mestizo, 0.12% Indigenous, 0.12% Black or Afro-Honduran and 0.08% White.

References

Municipalities of the La Paz Department (Honduras)